Poleumita is an extinct genus of medium-sized sea snails, fossil marine gastropods in the family Euomphalidae. This genus is known from the Silurian period.

References

External links 
 Paleobiology database 
 Photo of one species and more info 

Euomphalidae
Paleozoic life of Ontario
Paleozoic life of the Northwest Territories
Paleozoic life of Nunavut
Silurian gastropods